Lina Stergiou is an architect, cultural researcher, writer and curator, and associate professor who uses multiple formats spatial politics and the avant-garde, actively practiced and presented in conferences and symposia, and as essays and chapters to books, receiving the Princeton University Seeger Research Fellowship, 13 research grants and 2 research prizes, 7 teaching prizes and 11 design prizes.

Spatial politics and the avant-garde
Stergiou developed her research AAO into the social ecology activist series of projects AAO: Ethics/Aesthetics. Two-year long inter-national activities included conferences, academic workshops, exhibitions, collective experiments  and public actions that took place in Athens in 2011 and 2012. In collaboration with Benaki Museum, Hellenic Cosmos, Paris 8 University, Athens School of Fine Arts, National Technical University of Athens, Parsons School of Design, it mobilized 45 international artists, designers, architects, intellectuals, scholars, academics and activists (such as Rebar art and design studio, Futurefarmers, Public Architecture, Worldbike/Xtracycle, Cameron Sinclair, Laurie Lazer & Darryl Smith, Recetas Urbanas, Sarah Wigglesworth, Ole Bouman, Teddy Cruz among others) to address the state of crisis in Greece, social, affecting weak, unrepresented and unprivileged population groups, environmental, but also of the value system, and exploring the potentialities that spatial design opens for the cityscape, the social fabric and the environment. With its call for "Architecture, Design & Art Act Now!," AAO: Ethics/Aesthetics had a profound impact on architects, youth and citizens, enhancing collective awareness through design, described by Haido Skandila of Sunday Agelioforos as "avant-garde meeting humanity and requesting social change", or by Marios Kehagias of Athens Voice as "social architecture arriving in Athens", or by writer and literary critic Ilias Maglinis in Kathimerini as “let's leave theory behind and let's start acting,” reinforcing its call for interdisciplinary collective actions.

Its international academic workshops projected in open public spaces in downtown Athens aimed at creating places of social integration and of rediscovery of the nineteenth century city trace (pilot actions Athens Here and Now. They produced Social Collider in collaboration with transactional aesthetics H2H artist theoretician Maurice Benayoun and Art and Activism academic programs with artist Vicky Betsou, that have been part of Athens Art Week of the Hellenic Ministry of Culture, of Futur en Seine - Futur.e.s Paris , and of Athens Digital Arts Festival in Technopolis. AAO project series also included the social ecology installation environment Ecosmosis   developed with Benayoun at the Hellenic Cosmos, an interactive aesthetic and socio-spatial paradigm.  As "Praxis: The Everyday Not as Usual"  can the political ramification of this cultural activism be approached, while the public esteem that the AAO project received is recorded in 132 articles in daily and Sunday newspapers, architectural magazines and magazines on culture, and 8 interviews in radio stations.

Forwarding its catalogue AAO Project: Ethics/Aesthetics (Athens: Benaki Museum and Papasotiriou, 2011), the Minister of Culture and Tourism Pavlos Geroulanos notes that it "places architecture and design at the core of public debate", while the General Secretary of Regional Planning & Urban Development, Ministry of Environment and Energy, Maria Kaltsa, writes that it "reflects valid contemporary concerns... we are facing a period of great recession, which expresses itself as economic but is indeed a 'value system' crisis on all levels". For the Dean of the National Technical University of Athens, School of Architecture, Spyros Raftopoulos, it "is a well-timed effort to enhance sensitivity and concern, expressed though a range of activities...it has succeeded in creating a platform of dialogue...and, finally, to raise awareness among the general public...for the evolution of our urban environment", and for the Rector of the Athens School of Fine Arts, George Harvalias, "AAO project is pursuing its goals with the highest degree of competence and organization...an active creative 'plant' of sensitization, research and processing of proposals...indicating that any solutions cannot be unconnected to the unseen directions and dynamics of socio-political developments".

Biography
Lina Stergiou is born in Athens, Greece. She received her Doctor of Philosophy  in Architectural, Art, Cultural Theory and Studies from Kingston School of Art, London, her Post-professional Master's degree in Architecture and Urban Design from Pratt Institute School of Architecture, New York, and her Master of Science, Professional degree in Architecture, and Bachelor of Science from the School of Architecture, National Technical University of Athens. She has lived and worked in Brooklyn, New York City, London, Suzhou and Shanghai. She is an Honorary Professor Associate of Architecture at the University of Liverpool.

Books
 Lina Stergiou, ed., AAO Project: Ethics/Aesthetics (Athens: Benaki Museum and Papasotiriou, 2011), English/Greek, 432 pages. 
 Lina Stergiou, ed., Revelation (Athens: Cultural Olympiad 2001–2004, 2003), English, 520 pages.

Awards and honors
 Researcher of AAO, development into AAO Project: Ethics/Aesthetics, 16 cultural and sponsorship funds ca.€400,000, 2010–2012.
 Princeton University Seeger Visiting Research Fellow,  2004.
 Dean's Fellow, Texas Tech University, 2005.
 Research grants: 13.
 Research prizes: 2.
 Teaching Prizes: 7. 
 Research projects in EU, Asia, USA: 16.
 Papers and articles published and presented: 68. 
 Number of Journals’ Editorial Board: 3.
 Special Diploma Leonardo 2009.
 Mention with Diploma of the Union of Architects of Russia, Union of Architects of Russia, 2009.
 Design Prizes: 11.
 Exhibitions of projects in Asia, Europe, Africa, Middle East, N.+ S. America: 17.
 Invited Keynote Speaker in Asia, EU, Middle East, N.+ S. America: 11. 
 Independent Expert, Board of Nominators, European Union Prize for Contemporary Architecture – Mies van de Rohe Award 2019, 2017, 2015, 2013.

References

External links
 Against All Odds Project: Ethics/Aesthetics website
 LS/Architecture&Strategies website

Living people
Greek women architects
Year of birth missing (living people)
Writers from Athens
Architects from Athens